Balak Gadadhar is a 1969 Bengali film by Hiranmoy Sen. The film is based on legends about Ramkrishna Paramhansa. It stars Debashree Roy, Chhaya Devi, Gita Dey and Nripati Chattopadhyay. The music of the film was composed by Ahin Ghosh with lyrics penned by Shanti Bhattacharya.

Cast
Master Soumitra as an infant Gadadhar
Debashree Roy (Credited as Chumki Roy) as a tween Gadadhar and Devi Kanya Kumari as well
Tapas Manna as a pre-adolescent Gadadhar
Swapan Kumar as an adult Gadadhar
Chhaya Devi as Chandramani Devi, the mother of Gadadhar
Anubha Gupta
Gita Dey
Amaresh Das
Tarapad Basu
Rabi Roy Choudhury
Biren Chattopadhyay
Nripati Chattopadhyay
Bankim Chattopadhyay
Biswanath Mukherjee

References

External links
 

Bengali-language Indian films
1969 films
1960s Bengali-language films